Velairpadu is a Village & Mandal in Eluru district of the Indian state of Andhra Pradesh. Velairpadu was a part of Khammam district of then newly formed Telangana until the transfer of 7 Mandal including it to then newly formed Andhra Pradesh. Velairpadu mandal is a one of the beautiful tribe mandal in the Telangana and Andhar pradesh.Velairpadu is one of the communist land and this mandals have many beautiful places like Rudramkota and Kothuru villages.In the of british times this mandal is there in Telangana only.This mandal is fight with Nizams.In rudramakota village have nizam times forest office.Velairpadu mandal is a one of the tourist place, Why because this near by godavari river and papi hills.This is mandal have a 60 percentage tribal and 40 percentage Non tribal peoples are living.This mandal have 95 percentage of forest.This forest have Teak wood trees and Iron and granite lands.This madal havilng many water pojects like Indira Sagar (Rudramkota) Lift Irrigation Project  and Peddavagu Projects.

Velairpadu Mandal Villages:

 Chigurumamidi
 Gundlavai
 Kacharam
 Kakisnoor
Katukur
 Koida
 Kothuru
 Koyamadaram
 Lachapeta
 Medapalle
 Narlavaram
 Parentapalle
 Rallapudi
 Ramavaram
 Repakagommu
 Rudramkota
 Siddaram
 Tekupalle
 Tekuru
 Thatukur
 Tirumalapuram

References

Villages in Eluru district
Mandals in Eluru district